Mary Ellen Rickett (4 March 1861 – 20 March 1925) was a British mathematician who worked for many years on the staff of Newnham College, University of Cambridge.

After being educated at a private school, Rickett earned a bachelor's degree from Bedford College, London, part of the University of London, in 1881, and was the first woman to win the gold medal of the University of London. 

She studied at Newnham College beginning in 1882, and took both the Classical Tripos in 1884 and the Mathematical Tripos in 1885 and 1886. In the Mathematical Tripos, her score was next after the 24th Wrangler (and before the 25th Wrangler), making her first Wrangler of Newnham. In 1893, she was elected one of the first thirty Associates of the College.

She became a lecturer in mathematics at Newnham College in 1886, associate of the college in 1893, acting vice-principal of Old Hall in 1889, and permanent vice-principal in 1895. At Newnham, she coached Philippa Fawcett to become the first woman to get the highest score on the Mathematical Tripos, in 1890. Rickett retired in 1908.

References

1861 births
1925 deaths
Alumni of the University of London
Alumni of Newnham College, Cambridge
Fellows of Newnham College, Cambridge
19th-century British mathematicians
20th-century British mathematicians
British women mathematicians